The Schüsselkarspitze is a peak in the eastern Wetterstein Mountains. It is one of the best-known climbing peaks in the Northern Limestone Alps. It has a multitude of challenging climbing routes, especially through the mighty slabs (Plattenfluchten) of the south face. In the vicinity of the summit is a permanent bothy where climbers may take refuge in emergencies.

The Schüsselkarspitze was first climbed in 1894 by Heinrich Moser and Oscar Schuster who assailed its north flank. Until then the peak had been viewed as unclimbable as a result of several failed attempts.

Valley settlements: Garmisch-Partenkirchen, Leutasch, Mittenwald

Sources 
 DAV map: 4/3 Wetterstein und Mieminger Gebirge, Östliches Blatt (1:25,000). 2005

References 

Mountains of the Alps
Mountains of Bavaria
Mountains of Tyrol (state)
Two-thousanders of Austria
Wetterstein
Garmisch-Partenkirchen (district)
Two-thousanders of Germany